The 2011 Mecsek Rallye, officially Canon 45. Mecsek Rallye, was the eighth round of the 2011 Intercontinental Rally Challenge (IRC) season. The fourteen stage asphalt rally – held as a round of the Intercontinental Rally Challenge for the first time – took place over 10–11 September 2011 with all stages held in daylight.

Introduction
The rally, which was run for the 45th time, was based in the Mecsek mountain city of Pécs, in the Baranya County of Hungary. The opening events took place on 9 September, starting in Széchenyi square, in the old town of Pécs with a special musical performance, composed by Tibor Bogányi, the conductor of the Pannon Philharmonic Orchestra, for brass winds and car horns. Following the short concert the racers drove from the square to the Pécs Plaza, where the ceremonial start was held and the rally was officially opened by Csaba Nagy, deputy mayor of Pécs, Erik Bánki, president of the Tourist and Sports Committee of the Parliament and Zsolt Gyulay, head of the National Automobilesport Federation of Hungary.  The prologue was staged in the late afternoon on a  track and was won by local driver Dávid Botka ahead of Bruno Magalhães.

The rally began the next day; initially eight asphalt stages covering  were scheduled for Saturday, however, due to safety reasons the final stage of the day was cancelled.

Results
Andreas Mikkelsen led the rally from start, but was forced to retire on the penultimate stage after he hit a log, with Jan Kopecký taking the lead and held on to take took his second consecutive IRC victory on the rally, by just 0.8 seconds ahead of Thierry Neuville, in the closest finish in Intercontinental Rally Challenge history.

Overall

Special stages

References

External links 
 The official website for the rally
 The official website of the Intercontinental Rally Challenge

Mecsek
Mecsek
Motorsport competitions in Hungary